Lucius is an American four-piece indie pop band. The group was founded in 2007 by lead vocalists Jess Wolfe and Holly Laessig, joined by drummer Dan Molad, guitarist Peter Lalish, and, formerly, multi-instrumentalist Andrew Burri. Originating in Brooklyn, the band relocated to Los Angeles in 2015.

They have released three studio albums with Mom + Pop Music, including their most recent, Second Nature, in April 2022. Their music has received critical acclaim from The New York Times, Rolling Stone, NPR and The Village Voice. Paste named them as one of the best live acts in 2015. Wolfe and Laessig have also contributed vocals for artists such as Roger Waters, Jeff Tweedy, Jackson Browne, John Legend, Mavis Staples, John Prine, Sheryl Crow, Grace Potter, Goose, The War on Drugs, Brandi Carlile and Lukas Nelson & Promise of the Real.

History

Songs from the Bromley House and band formation (2005–2011) 
Jess Wolfe and Holly Laessig first met in 2005 as students at Berklee College of Music and began performing together. In 2007, they founded Lucius after moving to Ditmas Park, Brooklyn to pursue a musical career. The two lived in an old Victorian mansion which had a 60-year-old recording studio and vintage pianos inside.

In 2009, Wolfe and Laessig self-released Songs from the Bromley House, a biographical ode to the house and the experiences that they had in their Brooklyn home. During this period, they were joined by producer Doug Wamble. The band made a one-time pressing CD of the album and has not released the album since.

Shortly after the release of Songs from the Bromley House, Wolfe and Laessig connected with Dan Molad. By 2010, the three were collaborating on future Lucius music. During this period, Pete Lalish was introduced by Molad, and the two soon joined Lucius, making it a four-piece. About a year later, Molad met singer and guitarist Andy Burri who was invited to join the band. Following this, in 2011, most of the music the band had already made together was re-recorded and later released as their debut EP.

On July 9, 2020, Lucius announced it would be re-releasing Songs from the Bromley House digitally to raise funds for businesses affected by the COVID-19 virus. Wolfe told fans the news during an AMA portion of the streaming event. She said the album would be up for purchase on the band's website, along with several other signature items created especially for its livestream series, Turning It Around: A Community Rebuilding Concert.

Lucius EP and Wildewoman (2011–2015) 
The quintet released a self-titled EP in February 2012. Lucius received several placements in TV shows including Grey's Anatomy and Catfish: The TV Show. The band did a Tiny Desk Concerts performance in January 2013. The Silver Sound Music Video Film Festival + Band Battle awarded the "Go Home" video as Best Animation. Their song "Until We Get There" was featured in season 2, episode 24 of the TV show New Girl.

The band toured with the EP throughout the first half of 2013 while finishing the recording of Wildewoman, produced by band member Dan Molad. Mom + Pop Music released Wildewoman in North America on October 15, 2013. It received favorable reviews from Rolling Stone and Consequence of Sound. The album was released worldwide on March 31, 2014, via Play It Again Sam. The Guardian described it as "60s girl group-inspired songs doused in a tonic of baroque pop and saccharine folk." The record was praised for its eclectic mix of musical styles that ranged from retro pop to reflective folk.

The song "Until We Get There" was featured in the film If I Stay and was included on the 2014 soundtrack.

During their world tour between the fall of 2013 and the end of 2014, they also played their own shows and music festivals. Lucius opened for artists including Tegan and Sara, The Head and the Heart, Sara Bareilles, Andrew Bird, City and Colour, and Jack White.

The deluxe version of Wildewoman was released in October 2014. It features live recordings and covers, with one version of their song "How Loud Your Heart Gets" produced by Spoon's Jim Eno for Spotify. The band ended their world tour with a sold-out show at Terminal 5 in New York on December 6, 2014.

Good Grief and Nudes (2016–2021) 
The band's second album, Good Grief, was released on March 11, 2016. It was co-produced and engineered by Grammy-winning engineer Shawn Everett, and was mixed by Tom Elmhirst. Songs were inspired by the band's two years on the road with Wildewoman, and were written in late 2015 when the band relocated from Brooklyn to Los Angeles. Departing from their previous sound, the album focused on "moody Eighties-synth melodies and raw lyrics about the hardships of marriage."

The deluxe edition of Good Grief features the band's cover of The Kinks' song "Strangers" which gained attention from a crowd-sourced video of the band performing in Petaluma, California in August 2014.

The band has also performed tracks from the album on The Ellen DeGeneres Show, The Late Show with Stephen Colbert, and Late Night with Seth Meyers. "Born Again Teen" and "Dusty Trails" were featured on the fifth episode on Cameron Crowe's show Roadies. In the final episode of the first season, Wolfe and Laessig performed the Lowell George song "Willin" with Jackson Browne. In September 2016, Andrew Burri departed from the band.

On November 25, 2016, the band released a two-song 10 inch vinyl record titled Pulling Teeth which contained two B-sides, "Pulling Teeth" and "The Punisher".

The band released their first compilation album, Nudes, in March 2018. The collection features acoustic versions of songs from the band's back catalogue, new songs, and a duet with Roger Waters.

Second Nature (2022–present) 
On January 11, 2022 the band announced their fourth studio album, titled Second Nature, would be released on April 8, 2022 on the Mom + Pop Music label. The lead single "Next to Normal" was simultaneously released.

Collaborations 
Outside Lucius, Wolfe and Laessig have been involved in several albums as guest vocalists. 
 "Sonsick", "Bar", "Crueler Kind", "Sonsick", "The Count", "Oh Darling" & "Daedalus (What We Have)" (San Fermin)  – San Fermin (2013)
 "High As Hello", "Wait for Love", "Low Key", "Slow Love", "Nobody Dies Anymore", "I'll Sing It", "Where My Love" & "I'll Never Know" (Tweedy) – Sukierae (2014) 
 "It's Time to Come Home", "Traces of Our Tears", "Stardust", "1000 Season", "Damaris", "Irrational Things", "Thought of Sound", "Song of Remembering", "Seven Years" & "The Future" (The Rentals) – Lost in Alphaville (2014) 
 New Haven (Chadwick Stokes and Lucius) – The Horse Comanche (2015)
 "(What's So Funny 'Bout) Peace, Love, And Understanding" (Shovels & Rope) – Busted Jukebox, Volume 1 (2015)
 "Picture of a Man" (Dawes) – We're All Gonna Die (2016)
 "Penthouse Floor", "Love Me Now", "What You Do To Me" & "Surefire" (John Legend) – Darkness and Light (2016)
 "Déja Vu", "The Last Refugee", "Picture That", "Is This the Life We Really Want?", "The Most Beautiful Girl", "Smell the Roses", "Wait for Her" & "Part of Me Died" (Roger Waters) – Is This the Life We Really Want? (2017)
 "Defibrillation" (The Barr Brothers) – Queens of the Breakers (2017)
 "Lucky Penny" (JD McPherson) – Undivided Heart & Soul (2017)
 "I Remember Her" (Ingrid Michaelson) – Alter Egos EP (2017)
 "Pain" (The War On Drugs) – A Deeper Understanding (2017)
 "Set Me Down On A Cloud", "Die Alone", "Fool Me Once", "Carolina", "Forget About Georgia" (Lukas Nelson & Promise of the Real) – Lukas Nelson & Promise Of The Real (2017)
 "Come Again" (Kurt Vile) – Bottle It In (2018)
 "Mistakes We Should Have Made" (Dawes) – Passwords (2018)
 "Babe I Know", "Coolin' Out" (Nathaniel Rateliff & The Night Sweats) – Tearing At The Seams (2018)
 "Giving You Away" (Lukas Nelson & Promise of the Real) – Forget About Georgia EP (2018)
 "There's a Light" (Jonathan Wilson) – Rare Birds (2018)
 "Don't" (Sheryl Crow) – Threads (2019)
 "Shoulder Charge", "Football to the Path" (Jesca Hoop) – Stonechild (2019)
 "No Need to Argue" (Hannah Georgas) – No Need To Argue (2019)
 "Love is Love", "Back to Me", "Reposession", "Desire", "Please" (Grace Potter) – Daylight (2019)
 "Treat People with Kindness" (Harry Styles) – Fine Line (2019)
 "Straight to Hell", "Ordinary Man (feat. Elton John)", "Holy for Tonight" (Ozzy Osbourne) – Ordinary Man (2020)
 "I Don't Live Here Anymore" (The War On Drugs) – I Don't Live Here Anymore (2021)
 "You and Me on the Rock" (Brandi Carlile) – In These Silent Days (2021)
 "The Getting By II" (The Killers) - Pressure Machine (Deluxe) (2022)
 "Howling" (SYML) (2022)

Other 
Lucius have composed music for multiple film and television projects. They scored the soundtrack for Jake and Amir's web series, Lonely and Horny, released on Vimeo on April 8, 2016. In January 2017, the band scored Zoe Lister-Jones' directorial debut Band Aid, which premiered at the Sundance Film Festival. Lucius also wrote and performed an original song called "What's the Use in Crying?" in David Byrne's film Contemporary Color (2016).

Lucius have released music as part of tribute projects. The band covered "When The Night Comes Falling From The Sky" for the compilation album Bob Dylan In the 80s: Volume One and "Uncle John's Band" for the Grateful Dead 2016 compilation album Day of the Dead. In November 2018, Lucius contributed to a 7” vinyl series called the Fug Yep Soundation, launched in memory of the late Richard Swift. The series aims to raise awareness for addiction and “bring community to those suffering” by donating to musician-focused organizations MusiCares and Music Support UK.

In July 2015, Wolfe and Laessig performed with Roger Waters and My Morning Jacket at the Newport Folk Festival. In September and October 2016, the band performed with Waters and his band for three shows in Mexico City and the Desert Trip Festival in Indio, California.  On Sunday May 21, 2017 Wolfe and Laessig performed on stage during Waters' final dress rehearsal held at Meadowlands Sports Complex, NJ. They sang backup vocals on Waters' Us + Them Tour throughout North America, which began in Kansas City on May 26, 2017, and ended in Vancouver on October 29, 2017.

In 2021, samples from the song Madness were featured in an installation with visual and sound artist Samuel Stubblefield, to be released in 2022.

Reception
Lucius has been lauded by The New York Times for their "luscious, luminous, lilting lullabies", praised by NPR for their "charisma and charm," and described by Rolling Stone as "the best band you may not have heard yet."

The Guardian featured Lucius as its New Band Of The Day on February 14, 2014, and described them as "the missing link between Arcade Fire and Haim... How can they fail?  They won't." Economist and New York Times columnist Paul Krugman is a noted fan of the band and has featured their music in his blog.

The two frontwomen are also known for their synchronous style that exudes an "idiosyncratic visual persona" in their choice of dress, stage set up, and performance. The two even shared the same hairdresser, although they have switched to identical wigs.

In December 2018, Lucius' album Nudes was named by Rolling Stone as one of "11 Great Albums You Probably Didn’t Hear in 2018."

Current members

Jess Wolfelead vocals, bass synth 
Holly Laessiglead vocals, keyboard 
Dan Moladdrums, backing vocals, production 
Peter Lalishguitar, backing vocals 
Former member
Andrew Burribacking vocals, multi-instrumentalist 
Touring members

 Josh Dion – drums
 Casey Foubert – guitar
 Alex Pfender - guitar

Discography

Albums

Studio albums

Compilation albums

EPs 
Lucius EP (February 2012)
Pulling Teeth Ten Inch Vinyl (November 2016)

Singles

As lead artist

As featured artist

Notes

References

External links
 

Musical groups from Brooklyn
Indie pop groups from New York (state)
Musical groups established in 2005
Mom + Pop Music artists
Dine Alone Records artists